Pony Springs is an unincorporated community in Lincoln County, Nevada, United States.  Pony Springs is located along U.S. Route 93.

Pony Springs was a watering hole for early ranchers.

Pony Springs is the site of a roadside rest area.

This location is in Lincoln County and was not a stop on the Pony Express.  See Pony Springs in White Pine County which was also known as a Butte and was a stop on the Overland Trail and later the Pony Express.

References 

Unincorporated communities in Nevada
Unincorporated communities in Lincoln County, Nevada